Palekh is an urban locality (a settlement) and the administrative center of Palekhsky District of Ivanovo Oblast, Russia. Population:

Painting
Palekh has a very long history in Russian iconography, the art of painting Russian Orthodox icons for homes and churches. The village emerged as a leading center of Russian icon- and mural-painting in the 19th century.

A good example of the Palekh school are the murals and icons from the Church of the Exaltation of the Cross (built in 1762–1774).

Miniature painting
Today, Palekh is known primarily for the Palekh miniature. Following the October Revolution with its outspoken atheist ideology. Around 1923, the Palekh masters of iconography began to paint papier-mâché boxes while applying the same principles they had learned from painting icons. Palekh is the most renowned of the four famous villages, the others being Kholuy, Mstyora, and Fedoskino, each producing similar, yet a very distinct artistic style.

Materials
They used mainly tempera paints of bright colors and painted over a black background. The work usually represents themes from real life, fairy tales, literary works, and folk songs.

References

External links

Old photos of Palekh 

Urban-type settlements in Ivanovo Oblast
Golden Ring of Russia
Vyaznikovsky Uyezd